Shaw Nature Reserve, formerly known as Shaw Arboretum, is a  private non-profit nature reserve located in Gray Summit, Missouri, that is operated as an extension of the Missouri Botanical Garden.

The first piece of land, was purchased in 1925 when pollution from coal smoke in St. Louis threatened the Garden's live plant collection, especially the orchid collection. The orchids were moved to what was then known as the Gray Summit Extension in 1926. The pollution in St. Louis decreased with the waning use of coal for heat, making it unnecessary to move the rest of the live plant collection.

Shaw Nature Reserve has several historic homes (including the Joseph H. Bascom House), a large tallgrass prairie, and a wetland blind from which herons can be observed. The Nature Reserve is also home to the Whitmire Wildflower Garden, a  Missouri native garden with over 500 native plant species, and a children's Nature Explore Classroom. Over 17 miles (27 km) of hiking trails run through the Nature Reserve.

Shaw Nature Reserve is open year-round, 7-days a week, but is closed on some major holidays. Regular hours are 8 a.m. to 5 p.m. with extended hours throughout spring, summer, and fall. Last-entry is 30-minutes before posted closing time. Daily admission is $5 for adults, free for Missouri Botanical Garden members and children 12 and younger.

External links
Shaw Nature Reserve Homepage

Missouri Botanical Garden
Arboreta in Missouri
Protected areas of Franklin County, Missouri
Nature reserves in Missouri
Nature centers in Missouri